Asmir Misini (born 29 September 1985) is a Serbian professional footballer who plays as a forward for Šumadija Šopić.

Career
After playing for Šumadija Jagnjilo and Hajduk Beograd in the Serbian League Belgrade, Misini moved to Serbian League East side Dinamo Vranje in the 2015 winter transfer window, helping the club win the title and promotion to the Serbian First League.

In the 2016–17 season, Misini played for Kačer Belanovica in the Kolubara District League, the fifth level of Serbian football. He subsequently returned to his former club Hajduk Beograd for the 2017–18 Belgrade Zone League. After playing for fellow Belgrade Zone League side Budućnost Zvečka, Misini moved to Belgrade First League club Šumadija Šopić in the 2019 winter transfer window.

Honours
Glogonj
 Serbian League Vojvodina: 2004–05
Dinamo Vranje
 Serbian League East: 2014–15

References

External links
 
 
 
 

Association football forwards
FK ČSK Čelarevo players
FK Čukarički players
FK Dinamo Vranje players
FK Hajduk Beograd players
FK Inđija players
FK Novi Pazar players
FK Obilić players
FK Spartak Subotica players
FK Veternik players
Gorani people
Serbian First League players
Serbian footballers
Serbian SuperLiga players
Footballers from Novi Sad
1985 births
Living people